Oliver Tarbell Eddy (1799–1868) was an American painter.

He was born in Greenbush, Vermont. His father Isaac Eddy was a printer, inventor, and engraver. 

Eddy was taught copper engraving by his father. He taught himself painting.

In 1822, he married Jane Maria Burger in Newburgh, New York.

He moved to New York City in 1826, where he worked painting portraits and miniatures.

In the early 1830s, he moved to Elizabeth, New Jersey, and moved to Newark, New Jersey in 1835. He painted numerous portraits in Newark, particularly of the city's rising industrial elite.

Eddy moved to Baltimore, Maryland in 1841. In addition to painting portraits, he invented an early precursor of the typewriter and patented several other inventions. In 1850, he moved to Philadelphia, Pennsylvania where he lived until his death. He is buried in Woodlands Cemetery.

The Newark Museum of Art, Metropolitan Museum, and the Maryland Historical Society hold Eddy's paintings in their collections.

References

External links
List of Eddy’s works

1799 births
1868 deaths
American painters
Artists from Newark, New Jersey
Artists from Elizabeth, New Jersey